Cinemania may refer to:

Cinemania (film festival), a French-language film festival that takes place in Montreal
Cinemania (film),  a 2002 German/US documentary about five obsessed cinemaphiles
Microsoft Cinemania, a film database released annually by Microsoft between 1992 and 1997
Cinemanía, a Spanish language monthly film magazine based in Madrid